USS E.A. Poe (IX-103), formerly Edgar Allan Poe, an unclassified miscellaneous vessel, was the only ship of the United States Navy to be named for Edgar Allan Poe. She was chartered by the Navy in 1942, then taken over after being damaged and losing use of her engines on 30 August 1943. She was employed as a dry storage ship being towed among the islands of the southwest Pacific, issuing provisions to them as well as to ships and small craft in the area. She was placed in service on 23 February 1945 and out of service on 15 March 1946 when returned to her owner. She was stricken from the Naval Vessel Register on 28 March 1946.

References

External links
 Navsource.org

Dry storage vessels of the United States Navy
1943 ships
Edgar Allan Poe